Xystopeplus is a genus of moths of the family Noctuidae.

Species
 Xystopeplus rufago (Hübner, 1818)

References
Natural History Museum Lepidoptera genus database
Xystopeplus at funet

Cuculliinae